Elisângela Almeida de Oliveira (born 31 January 1978 in Londrina) is a volleyball player.

She participated at the 1999 FIVB Volleyball Women's World Cup. She competed for Brazil at the 2000 Olympic Games, winning a bronze medal. She claimed the gold medal with the Women's National Team at the 1999 Pan American Games. She also competed at the 2004 Summer Olympics in Athens, Greece. She was champion of the South American Youth Championship in 1996 and 1999, won three medals at the Grand Prix, and won the gold medal at the Pan Winnipeg in 1999, .

Career
She began her volleyball career at 15 years old. She joined the Brazilian national team in 1996 and won a medal in the South American Youth Championship. The next year she competed in Brazilian Superliga Women's Volleyball, and her team finished in eighth place. In 1999 she joined the adult national team; she was 21 years old. That year her team competed in the BCV CUP, finishing in fourth place. Her team won the bronze medal in the Grand Prix and the Olympics the following year. Oliveira's team also won the bronze medal in the 2000 Olympics, after which she joined another volleyball team. Joining the club was controversial as she was five months pregnant. On 17 May 2005 her son, Lorenzo, was born. Only two months later, she began training again.

Clubs
  Paraná Vôlei (1998–2001)
  Minas Tênis Clube (2001–2003)
  Paraná Vôlei (2003–2004)
  Santeramo (2004–2005)
  Macaé (2005–2007)
  Finasa Osasco (2007–2008)
  Brusque (2008–2009)
  Hisamitsu Springs (2009–2011)
  SESI-SP (2011–2013)
  Brasília Vôlei (2013–2015)
  São Bernardo (2015–2016)

Awards

Individuals
 2005–06 Brazilian Superliga – "Best Server" 
 2008–09 Brazilian Superliga – "Best Server" 
 2010–11 Japanese V-League – "Best Server"

References

External links
 
  UOL profile

1978 births
Living people
Brazilian women's volleyball players
Volleyball players at the 2000 Summer Olympics
Volleyball players at the 2004 Summer Olympics
Olympic volleyball players of Brazil
Olympic bronze medalists for Brazil
Olympic medalists in volleyball
Medalists at the 2000 Summer Olympics
Pan American Games gold medalists for Brazil
Pan American Games medalists in volleyball
Expatriate volleyball players in Thailand
Brazilian expatriate sportspeople in Thailand
Brazilian expatriate sportspeople
Volleyball players at the 1999 Pan American Games
Medalists at the 1999 Pan American Games
Sportspeople from Londrina